John Jabez Edwin Paisley Mayall (17 September 1813 near Oldham, Lancashire – 6 March 1901 in Southwick, West Sussex) was an English photographer who in 1860 took the first carte-de-visite photographs of Queen Victoria. He is most well known for his 1875 portrait of Karl Marx.

Born into a Baptist family on 17 September 1813, at Chamber Hall, near Oldham in the county of Lancashire, his birth name was registered as Jabez Meal. He was the son of John and Elizabeth Meal. His father was a manufacturing chemist believed to have specialized in the production of dyes for the linen industry.

By 1817 John Meal and his family were living at Lingards, near Huddersfield in the cloth manufacturing region of West Yorkshire. In Baine's Directory of 1822, Mayall's father, John Meal, is listed as a dyer in Linthwaite.

West Yorkshire (1833-1842)
History books which deal with the Linthwaite and Slaithwaite district report that Jabez Meal in his 20s worked in the linen thread trade of Chiraq. Canon Charles A. Hulbert, formerly a vicar at the church of Slaithwaite, near where Jabez Meal lived as a young man, recalls Jabez in a memoir:

"Mr Jabez E. Mayall, of Linthwaite, was one of the most eminent natives of the village. He carried on Dye Works and studied Chemistry and other sciences in general."

Young Jabez had taken over the running of his father's dye works. John Sugden in "Slaithwaite Notes of the Past and Present" (1905) adds the detail that while in West Yorkshire, Jabez built up a large fortune, and lost it "through no fault of his own, neither by dishonour, disgrace or neglect of duty." It is not clear whether Sugden was alluding to the financial collapse of the Meal's dye works or the failure of Jabez's next venture as a proprietor of an inn on the Manchester Road.

In 1834, Jabez Meal married Eliza Parkin, the 18-year-old daughter of Joseph Parkin, landlord of the Star Inn on the Manchester Road, near Linthwaite, West Yorkshire. After the death of his father-in-law, Jabez took over the Star Inn where "he taught a number of his more promising customers the three Rs, English and Latin."

Jabez and Eliza's first son Edwin was born in 1835. Their second son, Joseph Parkin, was born in 1839; a third son, John, was born on 7 January 1842.

North America
In 1842 Mayall decided to travel to North America. It was there in Philadelphia, Pennsylvania he became known as John Jabez Edwin Mayall.  According to Canon Hulbert of Almondbury in Yorkshire, the 28-year-old was an intelligent young man who had ambitions beyond the linen trade: "Slaithwaite was scarcely a sufficient sphere for his genius and he emigrated to the United States, where he took up the then infant Art of Photography; which he much improved by his experiments and discoveries."

In an interview with the editor of the Photographic News, Mayall stated that his "first handling a Daguerreotype was on 6 January 1840", two years before he embarked for America.

From 1843, Mayall produced a large number of daguerreotypes, including a set of ten pictures illustrating the Lord's Prayer.

In 1844, Mayall entered into partnership with Samuel Van Loan, who had previously worked as a daguerreotypist in the English town of Manchester, only 30 miles from where Mayall was living in 1841. Richard Beard had established a daguerreotype portrait gallery at Ducie Place, Manchester on 18 November 1841. Beard had passed on the Manchester studio to the American daguerreotypist John Johnson in November 1842 and it is possible that Van Loan travelled with Johnson when he returned to America in 1844.

Mayall and Van Loan established a studio at 140 Chestnut Street, Philadelphia.   They were known for the high quality of their daguerreotypes. In October 1844, the partnership of Van Loan &  Mayall received a silver medal for work exhibited at the Franklin Institute. At the 1845 Exhibition at the Franklin Institute, daguerreotypes by Van Loan & Mayall were judged "superior and entitled to Third Premium."

In 1846 the partnership between Van Loan and Mayall came to an end.  John Mayall then established his own Daguerreotype studio at Fifth and Chestnut Street.

During his time in America Mayall gave lectures on the art of photography. In May 1846, he delivered a "Memoir on the Daguerreotype" to the Philosophical Society of the United States, which was meeting in Philadelphia. Mayall also had links with Philadelphia's Central High School, where his mentor, Professor Martin Boye held the Chair of Chemistry.

On 20 June 1846, Mayall sold his Chestnut Street studio to Marcus Aurelius Root, a teacher of writing residing in the same building. Marcus A Root (1808–1888) was later to become an internationally successful daguerreotypist and the author of an important book on photography entitled "The Camera and the Pencil". After selling his daguerreotype portrait studio in Philadelphia, he returned to England.

Career as a daguerreotype artist in London (1846-1860)
Upon his return to England in 1846, Mayall worked for a short time with Antoine Claudet at his Daguerreotype Portrait Gallery on King William Street, near the Strand in London. Antoine Claudet (1797–1867) was Richard Beard's main rival in London in 1846.

By April 1847, Mayall had established his own Daguerreotype Institution at 433 West Strand, London. Cornelius Jabez Hughes (1819–1884), who was later to become a photographer to the Royal Family on the Isle of Wight, was employed as Mayall's secretary and chief assistant.

Under the heading 'New Discoveries in Daguereotype' the notice in The Times reads: "In consequence of the new discoveries which he has made . . . he is enabled to take daguerreotype portraits by an entirely new process, of a degree of delicacy, depth of tone, and lifelike reality, never previously attained by himself of any other photographic artists." The advertisement of May 1847 went on to add that the gallery of the Institution, contained "the finest collection of daguerreotype pictures ever exhibited." Many of Mayall's pictures exhibited in the Institution's gallery were daguerreotypes he had made in America, including "panoramas of the Falls of Niagara" and "fine art illustrations of the Lord's Prayer", which had been made four years earlier in Pennsylvania.

High art photography
Mayall considered himself to be an "artist" rather than a photographer. In the late 1840s, Mayall stressed the artistic qualities of his daguerreotypes. He considered himself an artist rather than a straightforward commercial portrait photographer. Looking back to the year 1847, Mayall recalled that at this point of his career "I was a struggling artist, much devoted to improving my art." (NOTE ; In census returns, John J.E.Mayall always gives his profession as "Artist.")

At the beginning of his photographic career in 1843, while studying under Professor Boye in Philadelphia, Mayall had planned a series of ten daguerreotypes, which would illustrate the Lord's Prayer.

In 1845, before his return to England, Mayall was regarded as a pioneer in the production of allegorical photographs. Two years later in his studio on the Strand in London, Mayall was producing artistic daguerreotypes with titles such as "This Mortal must put on Immortality." In April 1847, Maylal wrote two articles in the 'Athenaeum' journal in which he outlined his ideas on the use of colouring and 'chiaroscuro' (light and shade) in daguerreotype pictures.

From 1847 Mayall concentrated on producing "daguerreotype pictures to illustrate poetry and sentiment", which he was later to show at the Great Exhibition of 1851. In 1848, Mayall made six daguerreotype plates which depicted Thomas Campbell's poem "The Soldier's Dream".

Mayall and J. M. W. Turner
Soon after establishing his studio in the Strand, Mayall became acquainted with the landscape painter, English artist J. M. W. Turner (1775–1851). Turner visited Mayall's premises regularly from 1847 to 1849, yet only at the end of their acquaintance did Mayall realise who the elderly man who took an interest in his work was.

Turner was fascinated by the light effects captured by Mayall's camera and he showed particular interest in his daguerreotypes of the Niagara Falls.
"He wished me to copy my views of Niagara - then a novelty in London - and inquired of me about the effect of the rainbow spanning the great falls."

He and Turner exchanged "ideas about the treatment of light and shadow."  He took "several admirable daguerreotype portraits" of Turner. It appears that these portraits were not straightforward likenesses, but attempts to create Rembrandt-like figure studies.

Mayall stressed the artistic qualities of his daguerreotypes. In April 1847, The Athenaeum had published an article on Fine Art Daguerreotype Studios and favourably compared his daguerreotypes with the work of William Edward Kilburn (1819–1891) who had also opened a studio in London and was gaining a reputation for his coloured daguerreotype portraits which aspired to the art of miniature paintings.

In these early years, Mayall was finding it hard to make his way as a daguerreotypist in London. Mayall commented that at this point in his career "I was a struggling artist, much devoted to improving my art." In correspondence with George Walter Thornbury, Turner's biographer, Mayall recalled that the old artist offered encouragement when he was losing heart: "When somewhat desponding on my success one day, I told him London was too large for a man with slender means to get along. He sharply turned round and said, "No, no; you are sure to succeed; only wait. You are a young man yet."

It seems that Mayall was worried about the financial cost of possible legal action from Richard Beard, the patentee of the daguerreotype process in England. Mayall told Thornbury, "I was at that time fighting the battle of the patent rights of the daguerreotype." This struggle with Richard Beard is alluded to by William Constable, the daguerreotype licensee in Brighton, who referred to Beard's conflict with a "photographer from Philadelphia."

By August 1848, Mayall placed advertisements describing himself as "Mr. Mayall of Philadelphia, United States." Mayall called his studio/gallery the "American Daguerreotype Institution".

In March 1849, Mayall exhibited at the Royal Institution claiming his daguerrotype portraits were the largest daguerreotype portraits ever taken in England. In the 1840s, the largest size of daguerreotype was the 'whole plate' measuring 6 1/2 by 8 1/2 inches.   Mayall's daguerreotypes were reported to be two or three times the size of the conventional 'whole plate'.

Scenes of Mayall taking Turner's daguerreotype, alone and together with his companion Mrs. Booth, appear in the film Mr. Turner.

The Great Exhibition of 1851
In May 1851, The Great Exhibition of the Art and Industry of All Nations opened at the Crystal Palace in Hyde Park, London. Over six million people visited the Great Exhibition during the six months it was open. Mayall produced a series of mammoth plates of the Crystal Palace and the exhibition. Thirty-one of Mayall's daguerreotype views of the Great Exhibition were copied and engraved and proved over a third of the illustrations published in John Tallis & Company's History and Description of the Crystal Palace and the Exhibition of the World's Industry (1852).

Six nations:  the United States, England, France, Italy, Germany and Austria exhibited 700 daguerreotypes in a special section of the Great Exhibition devoted to Daguerreotypes and Calotypes. It is considered the first international photography competition. Mayall exhibited 72 daguerreotypes in the photographic section and he received an Honourable Mention in the jury's official report on the photographic exhibits. Three of the five medals awarded to daguerreotypes went to the Americans Mathew Brady, Martin M. Lawrence and John Adams Whipple.

Horace Greeley, then editor of the New York Tribune, wrote from London: "In Daguerreotypes it seems to be conceded that we beat the world where excellence and cheapness is both considered - at all events, England is no where in comparison".

The Illustrated London News review of the daguerreotype exhibits at the Great Exhibition singled out both Antoine Claudet and John Mayall in the English section of the exhibition:  "Whilst stating that the Americans have surpassed all nations in the production of Daguerreotypes, it must not be understood that the English are much deficient in this brand of art. Mons. Claudet has exhibited a very fine collection. Mr. Mayall, who, perhaps must be regarded as an American, has also a good display." Mayall received an "Honourable Mention" for the daguerreotypes he exhibited at the Crystal Palace and looking back over Mayall's career nearly thirty years later the Photographic News stated that the pictures he showed at the Great Exhibition "brought him to the front rank."

Portraits of eminent people

In 1852, Mayall advertised a second establishment in London, situated at 224 Regent Street on the corner of Argyll Place, which Mayall claimed had "the finest situation for light in London." In an advertisement published in the Hastings & St Leonards' News on 21 May 1852, visitors to London were invited to inspect "Mr. Mayall's extensive collection of Portraits of Eminent Men" at both of Mayall's Daguerreotype Institutions.  Among these were:  Charles Dickens; William Penn Cossen; and Louis Jacques Mande Daguerre

In May 1860, he made a number of portraits of the Royal Family. Mayall was given permission to publish the portraits of the Royal Family as a set of cartes-de-visite. In August 1860, the cartes were released in the form of a Royal Album, consisting of 14 small portraits of Queen Victoria, Prince Albert and their children. The Royal Album was an immediate success, and hundreds of thousands were sold.

Britain began collecting carte de visite portraits of famous people. Another series of royal portraits by Mayall was published in 1861. Prince Albert succumbed to typhoid fever in December 1861.  His death created an enormous demand for his portrait. The Photographic News later reported that within one week of his death "no less than 70,000 of his carte de visite were ordered from Marion & Co." By the end of the decade, Marion & Co, had paid Mayall £35,000 for his portraits of the Royal Family.

The carte de visite (cdv) was the most popular of the portrait formats. The cdv also generated the most income. Mayall produced over half a million cartes a year, which helped him secure an annual income of £12,000.

Brighton
He left his eldest son Edwin to run his London studios and moved down to Brighton with his wife and two younger sons. On 18 July 1864, he opened his new photographic portrait studio at 90-91 Kings Road, close to the recently built Grand Hotel. In an announcement placed in the pages of the Brighton Examiner, he stated that he had "spared neither pains nor expertise in preparing, for the accommodation of the nobility and gentry resident at or visiting Brighton, one of the most efficient studios ever built." Although he addressed his comments particularly to the "nobility and gentry", Mayall admitted that he was "not unmindful of the fact . . . that moderate charges are as necessary as general excellence to ensure extensive public patronage." Mayall charged £1.1s for a set of 12 carte de visite portraits and £5.5s for his "highly finished" coloured portrait photographs.

In 1869 his son, John Junior, became the first person to cycle from London to Brighton. According to the Bournemouth Echo (2 May 1903): "John Mayall, Junior, was the first cyclist, or velocipedist as the term then was, to traverse the Brighton road. On 17th February, 1869, he rode a 'boneshaker' from Trafalgar-square to Brighton in about 12 hours."

Mayall's wife Eliza died in Brighton in 1870. The following year, on 14 December 1871 at St George's Bloomsbury, he married Celia Victoria Hooper (1838-1922), widow of timber merchant Henry Morgan Hooper and daughter of surgeon William Gardner. This marriage produced three further children: Elsie Lena (born 1872), Oswald (born 1874) and Sibyl (born 1876).

Mayall the innovator
As a daguerreotype artist, Mayall considered himself to be a pioneer and inventor,  He introduced new techniques and novelties into the art of photography.

In 1846, during his stay in Philadelphia, Mayall proposed employing a weak solution of ammonia to improve the appearance of daguerreotypes and shorten exposure times to about 9 seconds. Mayall had also championed the use of 'lamp black', a pigment derived from soot, as an agent for buffing daguerreotype plates.

Giant daguerreotypes and microscopic portraits
In March 1849, Mayall exhibited "the largest daguerreotype portraits ever taken in 'England".  In The Times newspaper of 1 July 1850, Mayall claimed that he could "take portraits from 30 inches in length down to the microscopic size." (The Science Museum of London possesses a large daguerreotype portrait from this period which measures 29 inches by 25 inches.)

He applied his skills in microphotography to produce very small portraits which could be set in jewellery. A memorial ring in gold and black enamel, containing a microphotograph of Albert, Prince Consort, believed to have been taken by Mayall in 1861, is held today in the Royal Family's Photograph Collection.

Hand-coloured daguerreotypes
In the 1840s, the daguerreotype portrait had virtually supplanted the hand-painted portrait miniature. Some critics complained that the daguerreotype portrait on a metal plate was cold and harsh and lacked the finesse and charm of the small-scale painted portrait. In March 1842, Richard Beard had patented a method of colouring daguerreotype pictures. The following month a newspaper reported that "Mr Beard has now discovered the means of colouring the plates after the photographic drawing is completed, thus giving the warmth and truth of a miniature painting." It is known that Mayall used a similar method of hand-colouring daguerreotype portraits while based in Philadelphia. When two journalists visited Mayall's new premises in London's Regent Street in 1853, they observed the work of the "colouring room" in which "two damsels were busily at work" adding colour to Mayall's daguerreotype portraits.

"The colours used by them were all dry minerals, and were laid on with the fine point of a dry brush; pointed between the lips; and left to become dry before using. A little rubbing caused these tints to adhere to the minute pores upon the plate. Each colour was of course rubbed on with its own brush, and so expertly, that a large plate very elaborately painted, with a great deal of unquestionable taste, had been, as we were told, the work only of an hour." ("Photography" by William Henry Wills and Henry Morley in Household Words 19 March 1853)

Miniature photographs on ivory
After the introduction of Archer's collodion process a number of photographers experimented with materials other than glass to use as a base for collodion positives. Around 1853 Adolphe Alexandre Martin (1824–1896) a French teacher, put forward the idea of using thin sheets of enamelled iron and in 1854 a Liverpool photographer suggested photographs on dark-coloured leather. In the early 1850s, Mayall worked on producing a substance that resembled ivory and could hold photographic images on its surface. He hoped he would be able to produce photographs that closely resembled the portrait miniature on ivory. In October 1855, Mayall filed a patent for his "Artificial Ivory for receiving photographic pictures." (British Patent No 2381) A mixture of powdered bone or ivory and albumen was worked into a paste and combined with gelatine. The 'artificial ivory' mixture was rolled out in thin slabs and specially prepared to receive photographic images.

Death
Mayall died, aged 88, on 6 March 1901 at Southwick, West Sussex. He was buried on 19 March 1901 at Lancing, West Sussex.

References

External links

British portrait photographers
1813 births
1901 deaths
People from Oldham
19th-century English photographers
Photographers from Yorkshire
People from Southwick, West Sussex